Krishnadev Yagnik (born 17 October 1984), is an Indian film director and screenwriter, known for his works primarily in Gujarati cinema. He is known for directing films such as Chhello Divas (2015), Karsandas Pay & Use (2017), and Shu Thayu? (2018). Shu Thayu? and Chhello Divas are the 3rd and 4th Highest-grossing Gujarati films respectively. He has also directed the Hindi remake of his film Chhello Divas titled Days of Tafree in 2016.

He co-founded the film production house called Belvedere Films, under which the films Shu Thayu?, Chhello Divas and Karsandas Pay & Use were produced. He wrote and directed Raado (2022), Naadi Dosh (2022) and Vash (2023); all Gujarati films.

Filmography

Awards
Krishnadev was awarded as the best director for the film Karsandas Pay & Use at International Gujarati Film Festival in 2018.

References

External links
 

Living people
Gujarati-language film directors
21st-century Indian film directors
Indian male screenwriters
1984 births
Gujarati people
Film directors from Gujarat
Film producers from Gujarat